David Hughes (1753 or 1754 – 1817) was Principal of Jesus College, Oxford, from 1802 until his death by suicide in 1817. He was also Rector of Besselsleigh. He donated £105 to the college in 1809 to increase the value of scholarships for those entering the college from South Wales and England, to reduce the disparity with scholarships for those from North Wales. Hughes studied at Jesus College, obtaining his BA in 1770, his MA in 1776, his BD in 1783 and his DD in 1790.

References

External links
A picture of Hughes from the National Portrait Gallery

1750s births
1817 deaths
Fellows of Jesus College, Oxford
Alumni of Jesus College, Oxford
19th-century English Anglican priests
Principals of Jesus College, Oxford